Lorne Spicer (born 16 September 1965 in Upminster, Greater London) is an English television presenter best known for presenting reality shows on the BBC's daytime output.

Spicer started out as a reporter for BBC Radio Norfolk, and later wrote a weekly collectibles column in the Mail on Sunday. She went to Coopers' Company and Coborn School and has a degree in Communication Studies (Media). She produced a morning European business-news show and a personal-finance show. Spicer also presented various programmes for ITV and BBC One such as Boot Sale Challenge and was a regular guest on money matters for This Morning and GMTV. She also participated in the BBC programme Put Your Money Where Your Mouth Is, where she competed against Mark Franks to raise money for charity.
In the early 1980s, she spent some time working as a magician's assistant.

Spicer was also the presenter of the daytime BBC Television programme Car Booty.

Spicer lives in Thundersley, Essex, and is divorced with one son. 
In 2009, it was reported that Spicer had filed for bankruptcy.

Television programmes
Car Booty
Money Spinners
Put Your Money Where Your Mouth Is
Trash to Cash
Trading Treasures
Cash in the Attic
Everything Must Go
Boot Sale Challenge
My Life for Sale
Beat the Bailiff

They were all broadcast on the BBC except Everything Must Go and Bootsale Challenge, which were on ITV.  Currently, My Life for Sale and Cash in the Attic are being syndicated in the United States on Vibrant TV Network.

References

External links

1965 births
Living people
English television presenters
People from Upminster
People educated at Coopers' Company and Coborn School